Esmeralda "Es" Devlin  (born 24 September 1971) is an English artist and stage designer who works in a range of media, often mapping light and projected film onto kinetic sculptural forms.

Early life
Devlin was born in Kingston upon Thames, London, on 24 September 1971. She studied English literature at Bristol University, followed by a Foundation Course in Fine Art at  Central St. Martin's eventually specialising in theatre design. While undertaking her studies, she prepared the props for Le Cirque Invisible, the circus company founded by Victoria Chaplin and Chaplin's husband, Jean-Baptiste Thierrée.

Career
Her practice began in narrative theatre and experimental opera After a period working for London's Bush Theatre, she first worked for the National Theatre in 1998 when Trevor Nunn asked her to design the set for a revival of Harold Pinter's Betrayal. She has since worked on sculptural designs for the theatre. "Each of her designs is an attack on the notion that a set is merely scenery" wrote Andrew O'Hagan in The New Yorker in 2016. Devlin "is in demand because she can enter the psychic ether of each production and make it glow with significance."

In September 2018 it was announced that Devlin will design the UK Pavilion at the 2020 World Expo in Dubai. Known as the Poem Pavilion, it featured an illuminated "message to space" to which each of the Expo's anticipated 25 million visitors would be invited to contribute. The UK's participation theme was "Innovating for a Shared Future". Devlin is the first woman to be commissioned by the UK since world expositions began in 1851.

Her luminous fluorescent red Fifth Lion sculpture roared A.I. generated collective poetry to crowds in Trafalgar Square during London Design Festival September 2018. The Singing Tree, her collective choral carol installation at the Victoria and Albert Museum, fused machine-learning with sound and light and was viewed by over ten thousand visitors during Christmas 2017; her Mirrormaze generated queues around the block in Peckham in 2016.  Further explorations of labyrinthine and map based geometries led to the 7000 square foot hotel room odyssey Room2022 at Art Basel Miami 2017 and the projection-mapped ovoid model city MASK at Somerset House 2018.

The designer collaborated with the theoretical physicist Carlo Rovelli on an interpretation of The Order of Time read by Benedict Cumberbatch at the rooftop art space, BOLD Tendencies in Peckham in September 2018.

Devlin has made large scale touring stage sculptures in collaboration with Beyoncé, Kanye West, Adele, U2, The Weeknd, Lorde, Pet Shop Boys, and the Royal Opera House in London. Devlin also designed the London Olympics closing ceremony in 2012 and the opening ceremony of the 2016 Rio Olympics.

Her work has received three Olivier Awards. She is a fellow of University of the Arts London, and was appointed Officer of the Order of the British Empire (OBE) in the 2015 New Year Honours and Commander of the Order of the British Empire (CBE) in the 2022 New Year Honours for services to design. In 2018 she was elected a Royal Designer for Industry for Theatre Design. Devlin is the subject of episode three of a Netflix documentary series: Abstract: The Art of Design.

In 2019, Devlin delivered a talk at the TED conference in Vancouver entitled 'Mind-blowing sculptures that fuse art & technology'. It was later selected by TED curator Chris Anderson as one of the best talks of 2019.

Her collaboration with rapper Dave and producer Fraser T. Smith won an Ivor Novello Award for Best Contemporary Song 2021. She also collaborated with the artist Yinka Ilori on the design of the Britannia statuettes for the 2021 Brit Awards.

Her work on the 2022 Super Bowl Half Time show featuring Dr Dre, Kendrick Lamar and Eminem won 3 Emmy Awards including best production design while her work on Adele's Griffith Observatory performance also won 5 Emmys at the same ceremony.  She received widespread attention and a Tony Award for Best Scenic Design for her work on the Sam Mendes directed play The Lehman Trilogy.

Personal life
Devlin is married to the theatrical costume designer Jack Galloway; they have two children and live in London.

Recognition
She was recognized as one of the BBC's 100 women of 2013.

References

External links

Video: Es Devlin talk for Bloomberg BusinessWeek January 2013
Video: Es Devlin TEDx talk November 2012
Video: Interview with Es Devlin for the Royal Opera House

English costume designers
English scenic designers
Living people
1971 births
Commanders of the Order of the British Empire
Laurence Olivier Award winners
BBC 100 Women
People from Kingston upon Thames
Women costume designers
Scenographers
Tony Award winners
BRIT Award trophy designers
Royal Designers for Industry